Johan Benders (1 July 1907 in Bloemendaal – 6 April 1943 in Amsterdam) was a Dutch teacher at the Amsterdams Lyceum, who encouraged his students to manufacture false identification papers and food ration cards for Jews in order to help them escape persecution by the occupying Nazi Germany.  He and his wife, Gerritdina Letteboer, sheltered Jews in their home.  In 1943, however, they were betrayed by a neighbor and Johan was arrested by the Gestapo. In prison, he was tortured. Johan Benders had tried to commit suicide but failed twice. On 6 April he jumped from the third floor of the prison in which he was held, to avoid giving information under torture. Johan and Gerritdina took in Rosalie and Katie Wijnberg, Lore Polak, another Jewish girl, and Jan Doedens.

On 27 March 1997 Yad Vashem recognized Johan Benders and Gerritdina Letteboer as Righteous Among the Nations.

In Amstelveen, there is a street (Benderslaan) named after him.

References

Further reading
Glossary of Names and Commonly Used Terms from the Holocaust Memorial Center. Retrieved January 30, 2008.
The Righteous Among the Nations: The Netherlands from Yad Vashem. Retrieved January 30, 2008.
Johan Benders – his activity to save Jews' lives during the Holocaust, at Yad Vashem website

1907 births
1943 suicides
People from Bloemendaal
Dutch people of World War II
Dutch resistance members
Dutch Righteous Among the Nations
Suicides by jumping in the Netherlands